The 2012 Sundance Film Festival took place from January 19 until January 29, 2012  in Park City, Utah.

64 short films were selected for the festival from 7,675 submissions, including 27 international shorts from 3,592 submissions.

Non-competition features

Midnight

 Black Rock
 Excision
 Grabbers
 The Pact
 Shut Up and Play the Hits
 Tim and Eric's Billion Dollar Movie
 V/H/S

Award winners
 Grand Jury Prize: Documentary - The House I Live In
 Grand Jury Prize: Dramatic - Beasts of the Southern Wild
 World Cinema Jury Prize: Documentary - The Law in These Parts
 World Cinema Jury Prize: Dramatic - Violeta Went to Heaven (Violeta se Fue a Los Cielos)
 Audience Award: U.S. Documentary - The Invisible War
 Audience Award: U.S. Dramatic - The Surrogate (retitled The Sessions)
 World Cinema Audience Award: Documentary - Searching for Sugar Man
 World Cinema Audience Award: Dramatic - Valley of Saints
 Best of NEXT Audience Award - Sleepwalk with Me
 U.S. Directing Award: Documentary - The Queen of Versailles
 U.S. Directing Award: Dramatic - Middle of Nowhere
 World Cinema Directing Award: Documentary - 5 Broken Cameras
 World Cinema Directing Award: Dramatic - Teddy Bear
 Waldo Salt Screenwriting Award - Safety Not Guaranteed
 World Cinema Screenwriting Award - Young & Wild
 U.S. Documentary Editing Award - Detropia
 World Cinema Documentary Editing Award - Indie Game: The Movie
 Excellence in Cinematography Award: U.S. Documentary - Chasing Ice
 Excellence in Cinematography Award: U.S. Dramatic - Beasts of the Southern Wild
 World Cinema Cinematography Award: Documentary - Putin's Kiss
 World Cinema Cinematography Award: Dramatic - My Brother the Devil
 U.S. Documentary Special Jury Prize for an Agent of Change - Love Free or Die
 U.S. Documentary Special Jury Prize for Spirit of Defiance - Ai Weiwei: Never Sorry
 U.S. Dramatic Special Jury Prize for Excellence in Independent Film Producing - Smashed and Nobody Walks
 U.S. Dramatic Special Jury Prize for Ensemble Acting  - The Surrogate (retitled The Sessions)
 World Cinema Dramatic Special Jury Prize for Artistic Vision - Can
 World Cinema Documentary Special Jury Prize for its Celebration of the Artistic Spirit - Searching for Sugar Man
 Jury Prize: Short Filmmaking - Fishing Without Nets
 Jury Prize: Short Film, U.S. Fiction - The Black Balloon
 Jury Prize: Short Film, International Fiction - The Return
 Jury Prize: Short Film, Non-Fiction - The Tsunami and the Cherry Blossom
 Jury Prize: Animated Short FIlm - A Morning Stroll
 Short Film Audience Award - The Debutante Hunters

Premieres
The National Film Board of Canada (NFB) web documentary Bear 71 premiered January 20 in an installation at the festival's New Frontier multimedia program. The NFB  documentary Payback, based on Margaret Atwood's Payback: Debt and the Shadow Side of Wealth, and the documentary A Place at the Table, also premiered at the festival.

References

External links

 
 IMDb Profile

2012
2012 film festivals
2012 in Utah
2012 in American cinema
2012 festivals in the United States
January 2012 events in the United States